Sara Errani was the defending champion, but Flavia Pennetta defeated her in the final 6-1, 6-2.

Seeds

Draw

Finals

Top half

Bottom half

External links
Main Draw
Qualifying Draw

Internazionali Femminili di Palermo - Singles
Internazionali Femminili di Palermo